Roy Frumkes is an American independent filmmaker. Frumkes directed the 1985 documentary Document of the Dead, a film detailing the production of Dawn of the Dead.

Biography
The cooperation of George A. Romero allowed Frumkes extensive access to the creative process of the filmmaker, and the finished product is as much an overview and analysis of Romero's early career as a "making-of" documentary. In Video Watchdog magazine, critic Tim Lucas called Document of the Dead "an intelligent, arresting, and authoritative examination of Romero's working filmmaking style..." Frumkes added new codas to the film in 1989, and for the 2005 DVD release Dawn of the Dead: Ultimate Edition, which collected multiple cuts of the film and a cut of Document of the Dead. The full-length Document of the Dead was released on DVD by Synapse Films in 1998.

As a screenwriter, Frumkes has written the 1996 thriller The Substitute and three sequels, and the cult black comedy Street Trash (1987), which he also produced.

In 2006, Frumkes put the finishing touches to the documentary The Meltdown Memoirs. which depicts the production of the film Street Trash along with cast and crew interviews 20 years later.

On March 22, 2010, Frumkes confirmed to Fangoria magazine that he would produce a remake during 2011 of the 1958 British science fiction horror film Fiend Without a Face, but that remake has yet to materialize as of December 2017.

He is the owner of Films in Review, the oldest motion picture journal in the United States.

References

External links
 

Living people
Year of birth missing (living people)
American film producers
American male screenwriters
School of Visual Arts faculty
Screenwriters from New York (state)